Loshchina is a rural locality (a selo) in Starokalitvenskoye Rural Settlement, Rossoshansky District, Voronezh Oblast, Russia. The population was 451 as of 2010. There are 7 streets.

Geography 
Loshchina is located 27 km southeast of Rossosh (the district's administrative centre) by road. Ternovka is the nearest rural locality.

References 

Rural localities in Rossoshansky District